Chirutha is a 2007 Indian Telugu-language action film written and directed by Puri Jagannadh, and produced by C. Ashwini Dutt under the banner Vyjayanthi Movies. The film stars Ram Charan, Neha Sharma, Prakash Raj and Ashish Vidyarthi while Tanikella Bharani, Sayaji Shinde, Daniel Balaji and Brahmanandam play supporting roles. Ram Charan and Neha Sharma make their debuts. The film revolves around Charan, a young man in pursuit of a gangster who murdered his parents.

The film's soundtrack and score is composed by Mani Sharma, cinematography by Shyam K. Naidu and editing by Saibaba. Its filming began in 2007 and was shot extensively around Thailand. Chirutha was released worldwide on 28 September 2007. The film held the record of being the highest-grossing Telugu film for a debut actor until it was surpassed by Uppena (2021). Charan won the Filmfare Award for Best Male Debut – South and Nandi Special Jury Award for Best Performance in Debut film.

Plot
  
An auto driver witness Mattu Bhai murdering a journalist. He manages to capture Mattu Bhai and his henchmen and hold them until the police arrive. Afterwards, the auto driver returns home to his wife and little son Charan. Unfortunately, Mattu Bhai and his henchmen barge into their house later that night and kill him and injure his wife, but Charan survives unharmed. Charan's mother is in a critical condition, but Charan and his uncle do not have enough money to pay for her operation. The local mafia leader's son has committed a murder and offers Charan a deal. In order to pay for his mother's surgery, Charan goes to prison after falsely confessing to the crime.

12 years later, Charan is released from prison. When he meets his uncle again, he finds out that his mother has died. Charan meets Sanjana, whose father is Karthikeya, a rich business magnate. Ajay, a police officer helps Charan to get a passport. Charan plans to go to Bangkok to join a travel agency recommended by his uncle. Sanjana and her friends arrive in Bangkok as tourists. Charan is one of the tour guides but seems to be irritable around Sanjana. Meanwhile, Biku and his henchmen bother Sanjana. Charan saves Sanjana by attacking them. A few days later, Biku and his henchmen see Sanjana again, and Charan has to fight them again. Charan and Sanjana use a water bike to escape. They get stuck in the middle of the sea when their water bike runs out of gas. When Sanjana wakes up, she sees an island that is a little far away, meaning that she and Charan have to swim to the island. Later, Charan tells Sanjana that he loves her.

Karthikeya and the other people believe that Sanjana is kidnapped by Charan as they find out that Charan was in prison for 12 years. Karthikeya arranges helicopters to search for Sanjana. Charan sees a helicopter in the sky, but Sanjana does not want anyone to find them. Sanjana tells Charan that she loves him too and her father would never let her marry him. Charan loves Sanjana but did not expect her to fall in love with him. He reveals that he came to Bangkok to kill Mattu Bhai. Charan found out that Mattu Bhai is running a notorious business with network in Hong Kong, Bangkok, and other places. He has shifted his base to Bangkok. Charan tells Sanjana that Biku is none other than Mattu Bhai's son. In Bangkok, Charan tried to kill Mattu Bhai at a bar, but Mattu Bhai escaped and stopped coming to Bangkok.

By the time Charan finishes telling his foiled plot to kill Mattu Bhai, an army of black assassins arrive and a fight ensues. Just then, Karthikeya arrives in a helicopter. Sanjana, seeing her father runs to him and tells him not to hit Charan as he did not kidnap her, but instead saved her. At first, Karthikeya tells to leave Charan, and the goons leave him, but when Sanjana tells him that she loves Charan, Karthikeya tells the goons to kill Charan. The assassins knock Charan and leave. Then, a member of the company for which Charan works searches for him on a boat, finds him and takes him back. An heated argument takes place between Sanjana and her father, and she runs away to Charan.

Then Karthikeya calls Charan and tells him that his mother is still alive. His uncle lied to Charan that his mother died. Karthikeya will trade Charan's mother for Sanjana. Charan takes Sanjana to a building, where he tells her that he is going to trade her for his mother. He tells her that she has her father, but his mother has no one except him. Karthikeya comes and takes her, and gives Charan his mother, who was grateful to have him, back. Meanwhile, Mattu Bhai sees the pictures of Charan and Sanjana on television, which was the effort of Karthikeya to find her and recognizes Charan as the person who tried to kill him. He tells Biku to kidnap Sanjana.

Biku does the same when the exchange of Sanjana and Charan's mother begins. In the process, A shootout ensues where all of Karthikeya's men get shot. Charan also retaliates and kills some of Biku's men, but Biku escapes with Sanjana. Karthikeya gets shot in the leg and tells Charan that he saw how much he loves his mother and screams that someone is taking away his girlfriend away, so he reminds him to go and get her. Charan leaves his mother in Karthikeya's care and runs after Biku's car but fails to get him. One of Biku's men gets to him and gives him a phone, where he converse with Mattu Bhai. The goons take Charan with his hands tied to the island where Mattu Bhai and Biku are.

Mattu Bhai, without killing Charan and Sanjana as suggested by his son, lets them escape saying he would hunt them, but Charan kills all the men of Mattu Bhai and finally kills Biku. Using his body, Charan lures Mattu Bhai into his trap and then kills him, in the same way that Mattu Bhai killed Charan's father. This is when Mattu Bhai recognizes who Charan is.

Cast

 Ram Charan as Charan
 Akash Puri as Young Charan
 Neha Sharma as Sanjana
 Prakash Raj as Karthikeya, Sanjana's father
 Ashish Vidyarthi as Mattu Bhai
 Tanikella Bharani as Venkateswara Rao, Charan's uncle
 Sayaji Shinde as ASP Ajay
 Daniel Balaji as Biku, Mattu Bhai's son
 Brahmanandam as Krish
 Dharmavarapu Subramanyam as Subramaniam, Sanjana's PA
 Ali as Nachimi
 M. S. Narayana as Babi, Charan's boss
 Venu Madhav as Charan's jailmate and friend
 G. V. Sudhakar Naidu as Jailer
 Uttej as Charan's colleague in Bangkok
 Srinivasa Reddy as Constable
 Bandla Ganesh as Charan's colleague in Bangkok
 Pragathi as Charan's mother
 Surya as Auto Driver, Charan's father 
 Satyam Rajesh as Watchman
 Khayyum as Charan's friend

Production
The film had completed its Bangkok schedule and also the Hyderabad schedule. Again the unit left for Bangkok for the final schedule. After the launch and a few days of shooting at Bangkok, the unit returned to Hyderabad. In May 2007, a fight sequence was shot in a huge set was erected at a cost of around Rs 70 lakhs at Annapurna Studios under the supervision of Vijayan. Later, the unit left for Bangkok to continue its shooting there. The introductory song was choreographed at Hyderabad under the dance direction of Raghava Lawrence in August.

Soundtrack

Mani Sharma composed the film's soundtrack and score. The audio of the film was released on 22 August. The soundtrack received huge response and cassettes and CDs were sold quickly.

Release
The film was initially slated to release on 22 September but postponed to 29 September. The film released in 708 screens including 532 in Andhra Pradesh, 44 in Karnataka, 4 in Tamil Nadu, 3 in Odisha and 115 overseas. In Chennai, it debuted at number 1 and averaged 100% collections from 3 screens in its opening weekend.

Reception 
Chirutha received generally positive reviews from critics. Y. Sunita Chowdary of The Hindu mentioned that: "Chiruta is garnished well with commercial trappings. You'll find an adequate dose of romance, sentiment and dollops of violence" and praised Charan's performance that he "earn some serious brownie points for effortless dancing and fights". Sify appreciated Charan's performance stating that: "Ram Charan has rendered excellent performance in the dance and stunts departments [..] He looks smart and promising". Idlebrain rated the film 3 out of 5 stating "The first half of the film is alright. The second half slows down a bit. The plus points of the film are Ram Charan Teja, songs and fights. On the flip side a better heroine and a better second half would have done wonders to the film".

Box office
Chirutha collected a share of 12 crores in AP alone for 7 days. The film collected (share) in 50 Days and declared as a Box Office Hit worldwide. Chirutha completed 50 Days in 178 direct centres and 15 other shifted centres. the film completed 100 days in 38 direct centres.

Dubbed versions and remakes
The film was dubbed into Tamil as Siruthai Puli. On 14 September 2012 the movie was released in the Malayalam dubbed version named Cheetah. It was remade in Bengali as Rangbaaz with Dev and Koel Mallick in the lead.

References

External links
 

2000s Telugu-language films
2007 action films
2007 films
Films directed by Puri Jagannadh
Films scored by Mani Sharma
Films set in Bangkok
Indian action films
Telugu films remade in other languages